Sebastiania is a genus of flowering plants in the family Euphorbiaceae first described in 1821. It is native to North and South America from Arizona and the West Indies south to Uruguay.

Species
 Kew's Plants of the World Online accepts 60 species in the genus Sebastiania. Many species formerly included in this genus are now placed in genera such as Actinostemon, Bonania, Chrysanthellum, Dendrocousinsia, Ditaxis, Ditrysinia, Gymnanthes, Microstachys, Phyllanthus, Sapium, and Stillingia.

References

Euphorbiaceae genera